National Space Science Symposium is a biennial convention organized by Indian Space Research Organisation. The symposium is primarily for researchers working in the field of atmospheric, space and planetary sciences, astronomy and astrophysics, solar system bodies and their exploration.

References

Indian Space Research Organisation